David Banks (born 24 September 1951 in Hull, England) is an English actor, writer and author. He is best known for playing the Cyber Leader in the Doctor Who stories Earthshock (1982), The Five Doctors (1983), Attack of the Cybermen (1985) and Silver Nemesis (1988). As a theatre actor, he has played many leading roles in London and throughout the UK. He is also the author of several published books.

Career

Acting
His numerous TV appearances include long-running portrayals in Brookside, playing the wrongly convicted murderer Graeme Curtis, and 181 episodes of L!ve TV’s drama series Canary Wharf as Max Armstrong, head of news, who was finally abducted by aliens. He also appeared in EastEnders in 1992, playing the photographer, Gavin, at Michelle Fowler's graduation ceremony.

During the 1980s, he was the Cyber Leader in the science fiction series Doctor Who in all stories featuring the Cybermen: Earthshock (1982), The Five Doctors (1983), Attack of the Cybermen (1985) and Silver Nemesis (1988). In 1989, he played the part of Karl the Mercenary in the stage play Doctor Who - The Ultimate Adventure, except for two performances when he appeared as The Doctor, replacing Jon Pertwee who had fallen ill.

He writes and directs and has worked extensively as a voice artist, recording over 100 audiobooks – including an unabridged version of J. R. R. Tolkien's The Lord of the Rings (Talking Books, 2006). In 2007, he revived his portrayal of Karl the Mercenary in a Big Finish Productions audio adaptation of Doctor Who - The Ultimate Adventure with Colin Baker as The Doctor. In 2018, he reprised his role as the Cyber Leader for the Big Finish audio story Hour of the Cybermen and again in 2019 for the audio story Conversion.

Writing
Banks is the author of several published books. In 1988, he wrote Doctor Who – Cybermen, illustrated by Andrew Skilleter (Who Dares Publishing, 1988), which encompasses the history and conceptual origins of cybermen. He adapted the book into four audio cassettes, The ArcHive Tapes, which he also narrated. (These were re-released on CD in 2013 with bonus material by Explore Multimedia.) He later wrote the novel Iceberg (Virgin, 1993) for the Virgin New Adventures range of Doctor Who spin-off novels, which was set in 2006, when an inversion of the Earth's magnetic field is threatening to destroy human civilization, and featured the Cybermen and the investigative journalist Ruby Duvall. His play Severance, about the 12th century lovers Abelard and Heloise, was first performed in 2002. In 2008, he was invited to deliver a paper about cyber emotions entitled "Life as an emotionless killing machine: Cybermen in a Strange State" by the Universities of Sydney and Melbourne. This paper references the recent reappearance of Cybermen on television after a long absence.

Filmography

Television

Notes

External links
 David Banks: Spotlight entry
 David Banks Dr Who Image Archive
 

1951 births
English male soap opera actors
Living people
Male actors from Kingston upon Hull